Glycosylases (EC 3.2) are enzymes that hydrolyze glycosyl compounds.  They are a type of hydrolase (EC 3).  In turn, glycosylases are divided into two groups: glycosidases—enzymes that hydrolyze O- and S-glycosyl compounds (EC 3.2.1) -- and enzymes that hydrolyze N-glycosyl compounds (EC 3.2.2).

References

EC 3.2
Enzymes